Cervino may refer to:

Places
 Monte Cervino, also known as Matterhorn, a 4,478 metres mountain, located between the Aosta Valley (Italy) and the Canton of Valais (Switzerland)
 Cervino, Campania, a comune (town) in the Province of Caserta, Italy
 Txindoki, a mountain in the Province of Gipuzkoa, Basque Country, Spain

People
 Cerviño, a Galician surname

Other uses
 Monte Cervino Battalion, an Italian parachute battalion